The 2003 Georgia Tech Yellow Jackets football team represented the Georgia Institute of Technology in the 2003 NCAA Division I-A football season. The team's coach was Chan Gailey. It played its home games at Bobby Dodd Stadium in Atlanta.

Schedule

References

Georgia Tech
Georgia Tech Yellow Jackets football seasons
Famous Idaho Potato Bowl champion seasons
Georgia Tech Yellow Jackets football